The RNA helicase database stores data (sequence, structures...) about RNA helicases.

See also
 Helicase

References

External links
 www.rnahelicase.org

Biological databases
RNA
RNA-binding proteins